Qiaohuying station is a station on Line S1 of the Beijing Subway, it was opened on 30 December 2017.

Station Layout 
The station has 2 elevated side platforms.

Exits 
The station has 2 exits, lettered A and B. Both exits are accessible.

References 

Beijing Subway stations in Mentougou District
Railway stations in China opened in 2017